TEFI is an annual award given in the Russian television industry, presented by the Russian Academy of Television. It has been awarded since 1994. TEFI is presented in various sectors (up to 50 nominations in 2008), such as television shows, notable people in the television industry, journalists, channels. The winners are awarded the Orpheus statuette created by Ernst Neizvestny. It can be considered the Russian analogue of the Emmy Awards. The 2002 Edition was postponed to January 31, 2003 due to the Moscow theater hostage crisis.

Recipients 

 News programs
 Vremya (Channel One) — 2002, 2006, 2007
 Vesti (Russia TV) — 1995, 2001
 Segodnia (NTV) — 1996, 1997, 1998, 1999, 2004
 Vesti with Sergey Brilyov (Rossiya 1) — 2006
 Nedelia s Mariannoy Maximovskoy (REN TV) — 2008, 2009, 2010
 News 24 with Mikhail Osokin (REN TV) — 2010
 Culture News (Kultura) — 2003

 Game shows
 Umniki i umnitsy (Channel One) — 1996, 2001
 What? Where? When? (Channel One) — 1997, 2001
 Zov Djungley (Channel One) — 1999
 O, shastlivchik (NTV) — 2000
 Srazis s Natsiey (Bibigon) — 2008
 Total Recall (Bibigon) — 2008

 Other
 Gentleman show (Channel One, NTV, Rossiya 1) — 1994
 Spokoinoi nochi, malyshi! (Channel One)  — 1997, 2002, 2003
 Gorodok (Rossiya 1) — 1996, 1999, 2002
 Dancing with the Stars (Rossiya 1) — 2006
 Dve Zvezdy (Channel One) — 2008
 Thank God You're Here (CTC) — 2008
 Prozhektorperiskhilton (Channel One) — 2008, 2009, 2010
 Bolshaya raznitsa (Channel One) — 2009, 2010
In the World of Animals (Channel One) — 1996
 V Nashu Gavan Zahodili Korabli (NTV, TV6, TBC) — 2000, 2002
 Puteshestvie Naturalista (NTV) — 2001, 2002
 Vremena (Channel One) — 2001
 Zhdi Menia (Channel One) — 2001, 2002
 Tushite Sviet (NTV, TNT, TV6, TBC) — 2001, 2002, 2004
 Shkola Zloslovia (Kultura)  — 2003
 Little Non-Blue Light (Ren TV) — 2004
 Istorii v Detaliakh (CTC)  — 2006
 Poka vse doma (Channel One) — 2006
 Dezhurny po strane with Mikhail Zhvanetsky (Rossiya 1) — 2006
 Sto Voprosov Vzroslomu (TV Center)  — 2007
 History of Russian show business (CTC) — 2010
 Oryol i Reshka (Pyatnica!) — 2014, 2016
 Polyglot (Kultura)  — 2014
 «Fortress. The History of the Russian Crisis» (Documentary. Digital media; Alexey Bokov) - 2021

People 

 Vladislav Listyev — 1994
 Valentina Leontyeva — 2000
 Svetlana Sorokina — 1996, 2000, 2005
 Leonid Yakubovich — 1995, 1999
 Yelena Masyuk — 1995, 1998, 2002
 Alexander Maslyakov — 1996, 2002
 Fyodor Torstensen — 1997, 2004
 Vladimir Molchanov — 1998
 Konstantin Ernst — 1998, 2001
 Gleb Skorokhodov – 1999
 Alexander Rodnyansky — 2004, 2005
 Anastasia Zavorotnyuk — 2005
 Leonid Mlechin — 2007
 Dmitry Guberniev — 2007
 Ivan Urgant — 2007, 2009, 2010, 2011, 2014, 2015, 2016
 Pyotr Tolstoy — 2007
 Ekatherina Andreeva — 2007
 Sergei Pashkov — 2007
 Kevin Owen — 2008
 Sergei Kapitsa — 2008
 Dmitrii Frolov — 2008
 Larisa Sinelshchikova — 2009

References

External links 
  (in Russian).

Russian television awards
Television in Russia
Awards established in 1994
1994 establishments in Russia